Roy Asotasi (born 6 January 1982) is a former professional rugby league footballer who played as a  in the 2000s and 2010s. A New Zealand international captain, he also played for Samoa. Asotasi played in the NRL for Australian clubs Canterbury-Bankstown (with whom he won the 2004 NRL Premiership) and the South Sydney Rabbitohs from 2007 to 2013. He then played in the Super League for the Warrington Wolves.

Background
Asotasi was born in Auckland, New Zealand. He is of Samoan descent,

A product of the Marist Saints junior club in Auckland, he also attended Marcellin College, Auckland.

Professional playing career

Canterbury-Bankstown
Asotasi joined Sydney NRL club, the Canterbury-Bankstown club in 2000 as a  where he was a regular member of their Jersey Flegg Cup team, playing in the Premiership-winning team against Western Suburbs.

By 2002 Asotasi became a regular member of the dogs of war' Premier League team and received the opportunity to join the highest grade of Rugby League in Australia, the NRL against Canberra, when Glen Hughes was injured. He returned to the Premier League to play in the Preliminary Final against Penrith Panthers but was injured and missed the Grand Final win.

In 2004, Asotasi started the season in the NRL premiership and played every game of the season including the 2004 NRL grand final victory over cross-town rivals, the Sydney Roosters. In that same year he was also selected to play for New Zealand. He has played 14 Tests for New Zealand from 2004 to 2006.

As 2004 NRL premiers, the Canterbury-Bankstown faced Super League IX champions, Leeds in the 2005 World Club Challenge. In 2005, Asotasi played every match of the season before his sequence of 74 consecutive games was interrupted in 2006. He was injured just before the finals but returned to play in the Preliminary Final against Brisbane.

South Sydney

Foundation club, South Sydney Rabbitohs signed Roy Asotasi for the start of the 2007 NRL season. With Souths he played a major part in helping the club to its first finals appearance in over two decades by finishing in seventh position. That year Asotasi was awarded the George Piggins Medal as the club's best and fairest player for the season. Asotasi was named the New Zealand national side captain, as of the 2008 Anzac Test Match. He was named in the New Zealand training squad for the 2008 Rugby League World Cup.
However, in the round 25 clash against the Sydney Roosters, Asotasi picked up a pectoral injury and was sidelined for the remainder of the season and subsequently, took no part in New Zealand's Rugby League World Cup success. A pectoral injury also interrupted Asotasi's 2012 season.

In April 2013, Asotasi captained Samoa in their test match against fierce pacific rivals Tonga.

Warrington Wolves
On 2 July 2013, Roy signed a two-year contract to play for the English Super League club Warrington Wolves. His contract began in 2014.

On 20 August 2015, Tony Smith, coach of Warrington confirmed that he would be releasing Asotasi for the 2016 season as he wants space to sign one more player to the team next season. Asotasi finished his Warrington career with 58 appearances, 5 tries and one goal.

Highlights
Junior Club: Marist Saints
Career Stats: 218 career games to date scoring 15 tries
 Three Premierships with the Bulldogs, 2000 and 2001 (Jersey Flegg), 2004 (NRL)
 3 May 2007: first game played in the famous red and green.
 Appointed captain of South Sydney
 Captain of New Zealand National Rugby League Team (the Kiwis)

References

External links

South Sydney Rabbitohs profile
NRL profile
Bulldogs profile

1982 births
Canterbury-Bankstown Bulldogs players
Expatriate rugby league players in Australia
Expatriate rugby league players in England
Living people
Marist Saints players
New Zealand expatriate rugby league players
New Zealand expatriate sportspeople in Australia
New Zealand expatriate sportspeople in England
New Zealand national rugby league team captains
New Zealand national rugby league team players
New Zealand sportspeople of Samoan descent
New Zealand rugby league players
North Sydney Bears NSW Cup players
People educated at Marcellin College, Auckland
Rugby league players from Auckland
Rugby league props
Samoa national rugby league team players
South Sydney Rabbitohs captains
South Sydney Rabbitohs players
Warrington Wolves players